Emanuel Swedenborg (born Emanuel Swedberg; 29 March 1772) was a Swedish pluralistic-Christian theologian, scientist, philosopher and mystic. He became best known for his book on the afterlife, Heaven and Hell (1758).

Swedenborg had a prolific career as an inventor and scientist. In 1741, at 53, he entered into a spiritual phase in which he began to experience dreams and visions, notably on Easter Weekend, on 6 April
1744.
His experiences culminated in a "spiritual awakening" in which he received a revelation that Jesus Christ had appointed him to write The Heavenly Doctrine to reform Christianity. According to The Heavenly Doctrine, the Lord had opened Swedenborg's spiritual eyes so that from then on, he could freely visit heaven and hell to converse with angels, demons and other spirits, and that the Last Judgment had already occurred in 1757, the year before the 1758 publication of De Nova Hierosolyma et ejus doctrina coelesti (English: Concerning the New Jerusalem and its Heavenly Doctrine).

Over the last 28 years of his life, Swedenborg wrote 18 published theological works—and several more that remained unpublished. He termed himself a "Servant of the Lord Jesus Christ" in True Christian Religion, which he published himself. Some followers of The Heavenly Doctrine believe that of his theological works, only those that were published by Swedenborg himself are fully divinely inspired. Others have regarded all Swedenborg's theological works as equally inspired, saying for example that the fact that some works were "not written out in a final edited form for publication does not make a single statement less trustworthy than the statements in any of the other works". The New Church, also known as Swedenborgianism, is a new religious movement originally founded in 1787 and comprising several historically related Christian denominations that revere Swedenborg's writings as revelation.

Early life 

Swedenborg's father, Jesper Swedberg (1653–1735), descended from a wealthy mining family, bergsfrälse (early noble families in the mining sector), the Stjärna family, of the same patrilineal background as the noble family Stiernhielm, the earliest known patrilineal member being Olof Nilsson Stjärna of Stora Kopparberg. He travelled abroad and studied theology, and on returning home, he was eloquent enough to impress the Swedish king, Charles XI, with his sermons in Stockholm. Through the king's influence, he would later become professor of theology at Uppsala University and Bishop of Skara.

Jesper took an interest in the beliefs of the dissenting Lutheran Pietist movement, which emphasised the virtues of communion with God rather than relying on sheer faith (sola fide). Sola fide is a tenet of the Lutheran Church, and Jesper was charged with being a pietist heretic. While controversial, the beliefs were to have a major impact on his son Emanuel's spirituality. Jesper furthermore held the unconventional belief that angels and spirits were present in everyday life. This also came to have a strong impact on Emanuel.

In 1703–1709, aged 15–21, Emanuel Swedenborg lived in Erik Benzelius the Younger's house. He completed his university course at Uppsala in 1709, and in 1710, he made his grand tour through the Netherlands, France and Germany before reaching London, where he would spend the next four years. It was a flourishing centre of scientific ideas and discoveries. He studied physics, mechanics and philosophy and read and wrote poetry. According to the preface of a book by the Swedish critic Olof Lagercrantz, Swedenborg wrote to his benefactor and brother-in-law Benzelius that he believed he might be destined to be a great scientist.

Scientific period 

In 1715, aged 27, Swedenborg returned to Sweden, where he devoted himself to natural science and engineering projects for the next two decades. A first step was his meeting with King Charles XII of Sweden in the city of Lund, in 1716. The Swedish inventor Christopher Polhem, who became a close friend of Swedenborg, was also present. Swedenborg's purpose was to persuade the king to fund an observatory in northern Sweden. However, the warlike king did not consider this project important enough, but did appoint Swedenborg to be assessor-extraordinary on the Swedish Board of Mines (Bergskollegium) in Stockholm.

From 1716 to 1718, aged 30, Swedenborg published a scientific periodical entitled Daedalus Hyperboreus ("The Northern Daedalus"), a record of mechanical and mathematical inventions and discoveries. One notable description was that of a flying machine, the same he had been sketching a few years earlier.

In 1718, Swedenborg published an article that attempted to explain spiritual and mental events in terms of minute vibrations, or "tremulations".

Upon the death of Charles XII, Queen Ulrika Eleonora ennobled Swedenborg and his siblings. It was common in Sweden during the 17th and 18th centuries for the children of bishops to receive that honor, as a recognition of the services of their father. The family name was changed from Swedberg to Swedenborg.

In 1724, he was offered the chair of mathematics at Uppsala University, but he declined and said that he had dealt mainly with geometry, chemistry and metallurgy during his career. He also said that he did not have the gift of eloquent speech because of a stutter, as recognized by many of his acquaintances; it forced him to speak slowly and carefully, and there are no known occurrences of his speaking in public. The Swedish critic Olof Lagerkrantz proposed that Swedenborg compensated for his impediment by extensive argumentation in writing.

New direction of studies ahead of his time 
During the 1730s, Swedenborg undertook many studies of anatomy and physiology. He had the first known anticipation of the neuron concept. It was not until a century later that science recognized the full significance of the nerve cell. He also had prescient ideas about the cerebral cortex, the hierarchical organization of the nervous system, the localization of the cerebrospinal fluid, the functions of the pituitary gland, the perivascular spaces, the foramen of Magendie, the idea of somatotopic organization, and the association of frontal brain regions with the intellect. In some cases, his conclusions have been experimentally verified in modern times.

In the 1730s, Swedenborg became increasingly interested in spiritual matters and was determined to find a theory to explain how matter relates to spirit. Swedenborg's desire to understand the order and the purpose of creation first led him to investigate the structure of matter and the process of creation itself. In the Principia, he outlined his philosophical method, which incorporated experience, geometry (the means by which the inner order of the world can be known) and the power of reason. He also outlined his cosmology, which included the first presentation of his nebular hypothesis. (There is evidence that Swedenborg may have preceded Kant by as much as 20 years in the development of that hypothesis.)

In 1735, in Leipzig, he published a three-volume work, Opera philosophica et mineralis ("Philosophical and mineralogical works") in which he tried to conjoin philosophy and metallurgy. The work was mainly appreciated for its chapters on the analysis of the smelting of iron and copper, and it was the work that gave Swedenborg his international reputation. The same year, he also published the small manuscript de Infinito ("On the Infinite") in which he attempted to explain how the finite is related to the infinite and how the soul is connected to the body. It was the first manuscript in which he touched upon such matters. He knew that it might clash with established theologies since he presented the view that the soul is based on material substances. He also conducted dedicated studies of the fashionable philosophers of the time such as John Locke, Christian von Wolff, Gottfried Wilhelm Leibniz, and Descartes and earlier thinkers such as Plato, Aristotle, Plotinus and Augustine of Hippo.

In 1743, at the age of 55, Swedenborg requested a leave of absence to go abroad. His purpose was to gather source material for Regnum animale (The Animal Kingdom, or Kingdom of Life), a subject on which books were not readily available in Sweden. The aim of the book was to explain the soul from an anatomical point of view. He had planned to produce a total of 17 volumes.

Journal of Dreams 
By 1744, when he was 56, Swedenborg had traveled to the Netherlands. Around the time, he began having strange dreams. Swedenborg carried a travel journal with him on most of his travels and did so on this journey. The whereabouts of the diary were long unknown, but it was discovered in the Royal Library in the 1850s and was published in 1859 as Drömboken, or Journal of Dreams.

Swedenborg experienced many different dreams and visions, some greatly pleasurable, others highly disturbing. The experiences continued as he traveled to London to progress the publication of Regnum animale. This process, which one biographer has proposed as cathartic and comparable to the Catholic concept of Purgatory, continued for six months. He also proposed that what Swedenborg was recording in his Journal of Dreams was a battle between the love of himself and the love of God.

Visions and spiritual insights 
In the last entry of the journal from 26–27 October 1744, Swedenborg appears to be clear as to which path to follow. He felt that he should drop his current project and write a new book about the worship of God. He soon began working on De cultu et amore Dei, or The Worship and Love of God. It was never fully completed, but Swedenborg still had it published in London in June 1745.

In 1745, aged 57, Swedenborg was dining in a private room at a tavern in London. By the end of the meal, a darkness fell upon his eyes, and the room shifted character. Suddenly, he saw a person sitting at a corner of the room, telling him: "Do not eat too much!". Swedenborg, scared, hurried home. Later that night, the same man appeared in his dreams. The man told Swedenborg that he was the Lord, that he had appointed Swedenborg to reveal the spiritual meaning of the Bible and that he would guide Swedenborg in what to write. The same night, the spiritual world was opened to Swedenborg.

Scriptural commentary and writings 

In June 1747, Swedenborg resigned his post as assessor of the board of mines. He explained that he was obliged to complete a work that he had begun and requested to receive half his salary as a pension. He took up afresh his study of Hebrew and began to work on the spiritual interpretation of the Bible with the goal of interpreting the spiritual meaning of every verse. From sometime between 1746 and 1747 and for ten years henceforth, he devoted his energy to the task. Usually abbreviated as Arcana Cœlestia or under the Latin variant Arcana Caelestia (translated as Heavenly Arcana, Heavenly Mysteries, or Secrets of Heaven depending on modern English-language editions), the book became his magnum opus and the basis of his further theological works.

The work was anonymous, and Swedenborg was not identified as the author until the late 1750s. It had eight volumes, published between 1749 and 1756. It attracted little attention, as few people could penetrate its meaning.

His writings were filled with symbolism - Swedenborg often used stones to represent truth, snakes for evil, houses for intelligence, and cities for religious systems. He also described the appearance of heaven in great detail, as well as inhabitants from other planets.

His life from 1747 to his death was spent in Stockholm, the Netherlands, and London. During the 25 years, he wrote another 14 works of a spiritual nature; most were published during his lifetime.

One of Swedenborg's lesser-known works presents a startling claim: that the Last Judgment had begun in the previous year (1757) and was completed by the end of that year and that he had witnessed it. According to The Heavenly Doctrine, the Last Judgment took place not in the physical world but in the World of Spirits, halfway between heaven and hell, through which all pass on their way to heaven or hell. The Judgment took place because the Christian church had lost its charity and faith, resulting in a loss of spiritual free will that threatened the equilibrium between heaven and hell in everyone's life.

The Heavenly Doctrine also teaches that the Last Judgement was followed by the Second Coming of Jesus Christ, which occurred not by Christ in person but by a revelation from him through the inner, spiritual sense of the Word through Swedenborg.

In another of his theological works, Swedenborg wrote that eating meat, regarded in itself, "is something profane" and was not practised in the early days of the human race. However, he said, it now is a matter of conscience, and no one is condemned for doing it. Nonetheless, the early-days ideal appears to have given rise to the idea that Swedenborg was a vegetarian. That conclusion may have been reinforced by the fact that a number of Swedenborg's early followers were part of the vegetarian movement that arose in Britain in the 19th century. However, the only reports on Swedenborg himself are contradictory. His landlord in London, Shearsmith, said he ate no meat, but his maid, who served Swedenborg, said that he ate eels and pigeon pie.

In Earths in the Universe, it is stated that he conversed with spirits from Jupiter, Mars, Mercury, Saturn, Venus and the Moon, as well as spirits from planets beyond the Solar System. From the "encounters", he concluded that the planets of the Solar System are inhabited and that such an enormous undertaking as the universe could not have been created for just one race on a planet or one "Heaven" derived from its properties per planet. Many Heavenly societies were also needed to increase the perfection of the angelic Heavens and Heaven to fill in deficiencies and gaps in other societies. He argued: "What would this be to God, Who is infinite, and to whom a thousand or tens of thousands of planets, and all of them full of inhabitants, would be scarcely anything!" Swedenborg and the question of life on other planets has been extensively reviewed elsewhere.

Swedenborg published his work in London or the Netherlands to escape censorship by the Swedish Empire.

In July 1770, at the age of 82, he traveled to Amsterdam to complete the publication of his last work. The book, Vera Christiana Religio (The True Christian Religion), was published there in 1771 and was one of the most appreciated of his works. Designed to explain his teachings to Lutherans, it is the most concrete of his works.

Later life
In the summer of 1771, he traveled to London. Shortly before Christmas, he had a stroke and was partially paralyzed and confined to bed. His health improved somewhat, but he died in 1772. There are several accounts of his last months, made by those with whom he stayed and by Arvid Ferelius, a pastor of the Swedish Church in London, who visited him several times.

There is evidence that Swedenborg wrote a letter to John Wesley, the founder of Methodism, in February. Swedenborg said that he had been told in the world of spirits that Wesley wanted to speak with him. Wesley, startled since he had not told anyone of his interest in Swedenborg, replied that he was going on a journey for six months and would contact Swedenborg on his return. Swedenborg replied that that would be too late since Swedenborg would be going to the spiritual world for the last time on March 29. (Wesley later read and commented extensively on Swedenborg's work.) Swedenborg's landlord's servant girl, Elizabeth Reynolds, also said that Swedenborg had predicted the date and that he was as happy about it as if he was "going on holiday or to some merrymaking":

He was buried in the Swedish Church in Princes Square in Shadwell, London. On the 140th anniversary of his death, in 1912/1913, his remains were transferred to Uppsala Cathedral in Sweden, where they now rest close to the grave of the botanist Carl Linnaeus. In 1917, the Swedish Church in Shadwell was demolished, and the Swedish community that had grown around the parish moved to Marylebone. In 1938, Princes Square was redeveloped, and in his honour the local road was renamed Swedenborg Gardens. In 1997, a garden, play area and memorial, near the road, were created in his memory.

Veracity 
Swedenborg's transition from scientist to revelator or mystic has fascinated many people. He has had a variety of both supporting and critical biographers. Some propose that he did not have a revelation at all but developed his theological ideas from sources which ranged from his father to earlier figures in the history of thought, notably Plotinus. That position was first taken by Swedish writer Martin Lamm who wrote a biography of Swedenborg in 1915. Swedish critic and publicist Olof Lagercrantz had a similar point of view, calling Swedenborg's theological writing "a poem about a foreign country with peculiar laws and customs".

Swedenborg's approach to proving the veracity of his theological teachings was to use voluminous quotations from the Old Testament and the New Testament to demonstrate agreement with the Bible, and this is found throughout his theological writings. A Swedish Royal Council considering heresy charges against two Swedish promoters of his theological writings concluded that "there is much that is true and useful in Swedenborg's writings". Victor Hugo suggested in passing, in Chapter 14 of Les Misérables, that Swedenborg, in company with Blaise Pascal, had "glided into insanity".

Scientific beliefs
Swedenborg proposed many scientific ideas during his lifetime. In his youth, he wanted to present a new idea every day, as he wrote to his brother-in-law Erik Benzelius in 1718. Around 1730, he had changed his mind, and instead believed that higher knowledge is not something that can be acquired, but that it is based on intuition. After 1745, he instead considered himself receiving scientific knowledge in a spontaneous manner from angels.

From 1745, when he considered himself to have entered a spiritual state, he tended to phrase his "experiences" in empirical terms, to report accurately things he had experienced on his spiritual journeys.

One of his ideas that is considered most crucial for the understanding of his theology is his notion of correspondences. But, in fact, he first presented the theory of correspondences only in 1744, in the first volume of Regnum Animale dealing with the human soul.

The basis of the correspondence theory is that there is a relationship among the natural ("physical"), the spiritual, and the divine worlds. The foundations of this theory can be traced to Neoplatonism and the philosopher Plotinus in particular. With the aid of this scenario, Swedenborg now interpreted the Bible in a different light, claiming that even the most apparently trivial sentences could hold a profound spiritual meaning. Swedenborg argued that it is the presence of that spiritual sense which makes the Word divine.

Prophetic accounts
Four incidents of purported psychic ability of Swedenborg exist in the literature. There are several versions of each story.

Fire anecdotes 
On Thursday, 19 July 1759 a great and well-documented fire broke out in Stockholm, Sweden. In the high and increasing wind it spread very fast, consuming about 300 houses and making 2000 people homeless.

When the fire broke out Swedenborg was at a dinner with friends in Gothenburg, about 400 km from Stockholm. He became agitated and told the party at six o'clock that there was a fire in Stockholm, that it had consumed his neighbour's home and was threatening his own. Two hours later, he exclaimed with relief that the fire had stopped three doors from his home. In the excitement following his report, word even reached the ears of the provincial governor, who summoned Swedenborg that same evening and asked for a detailed recounting.

At that time, it took two to three days for news from Stockholm to reach Gothenburg by courier, so that is the shortest duration in which the news of the fire could reach Gothenburg. The first messenger from Stockholm with news of the fire was from the Board of Trade, who arrived Monday evening. The second messenger was a royal courier, who arrived on Tuesday. Both of these reports confirmed every statement to the precise hour that Swedenborg first expressed the information. The accounts are fully described in Bergquist, pp. 312–313 and in Chapter 31 of The Swedenborg Epic. According to Swedenborg's biographer Lars Bergquist, however, this event took place on Sunday, July 29 – ten days after the fire.

(Bergquist states, but does not document, that Swedenborg confirmed his vision of the fire incident to his good friend, Consul Christopher Springer, "one of the pillars of the church, ... a man of enviable reputation for virtue and intelligence", and that Swedenborg's innkeeper, Erik Bergström, heard Swedenborg affirming the story.)

According to Swedenborg's followers, it seems unlikely that the many witnesses to Swedenborg's distress during the fire, and his immediate report of it to the provincial governor, would have left room for doubt in the public eye of Swedenborg's report. They further contend that if Swedenborg had only received news of the fire by the normal methods there would have been no issue of psychic perception recorded for history. Instead, "when the news of Swedenborg's extraordinary vision of the fire reached the capital, public curiosity about him was very much aroused."

A second fire anecdote, similar to the first one, but less cited, is the incident of the mill owner Bolander. Swedenborg warned him, again abruptly, of an incipient fire in one of his mills.

Queen of Sweden
The third event was in 1758 when Swedenborg visited Queen Louisa Ulrika of Sweden, who asked him to tell her something about her deceased brother Prince Augustus William of Prussia. The next day, Swedenborg whispered something in her ear that turned the Queen pale and she explained that this was something only she and her brother could know about.

Lost document 
The fourth incident involved a woman who had lost an important document, and came to Swedenborg asking if a recently deceased person could tell him where it was, which he (in some sources) was said to have done the following night.

Although not typically cited along with these three episodes, there was one further piece of evidence: Swedenborg was noted by the seamen of the ships that he sailed between Stockholm and London to always have excellent sailing conditions. When asked about this by a friend, Swedenborg played down the matter, saying he was surprised by this experience himself and that he was certainly not able to do miracles.

Kant's view 

In 1763, Immanuel Kant, then at the beginning of his career, was impressed by accounts of Swedenborg's psychic abilities and made inquiries to find out if they were true. He also ordered all eight volumes of the expensive Arcana Cœlestia (Heavenly Arcana or Heavenly Mysteries). One Charlotte von Knobloch wrote to Kant asking his opinion of Swedenborg's psychic experiences. Kant wrote a very affirmative reply, referring to Swedenborg's "miraculous" gift, and characterizing him as "reasonable, agreeable, remarkable and sincere" and "a scholar", in one of his letters to Moses Mendelssohn, and expressing regret that he (Kant) had never met Swedenborg. Joseph Green, his English friend, who investigated the matter for Kant, including by visiting Swedenborg's home, found Swedenborg to be a "sensible, pleasant and openhearted" man and here again, a scholar.

However, three years later, in 1766, Kant wrote and published anonymously a small book entitled Träume eines Geistersehers (Dreams of a Spirit-Seer) that was a scathing critique of Swedenborg and his writings. He termed Swedenborg a "spook hunter" "without official office or occupation". As rationale for his critique, Kant said he wanted to stop "ceaseless questioning" and inquiries about Dreams from "inquisitive" persons, both known and unknown. Kant's friend Moses Mendelssohn thought there was a "joking pensiveness" in Dreams that sometimes left the reader in doubt as to whether Dreams was meant to make "metaphysics laughable or spirit-seeking credible". In one of his letters to Mendelssohn, Kant refers to Dreams less-than-enthusiastically as a "desultory little essay".

Theology

Swedenborg claimed in The Heavenly Doctrine that the teachings of the Second Coming of Jesus Christ were revealed to him.

Swedenborg considered his theology a revelation of the true Christian religion that had become obfuscated through centuries of theology. However, he did not refer to his writings as theology since he considered it based on actual experiences, unlike theology, except in the title of his last work. Neither did he wish to compare it to philosophy, a discipline he discarded in 1748 because, he claimed, it "darkens the mind, blinds us, and wholly rejects the faith".

The foundation of Swedenborg's theology was laid down in Arcana Cœlestia (Heavenly Mysteries), published in eight Latin volumes from 1749 to 1756. In a significant portion of that work, he interprets the Biblical passages of Genesis and Exodus. He reviews what he says is the inner spiritual sense of these two works of the Word of God. (He later made a similar review of the inner sense of the book of Revelation in Apocalypse Revealed.) Most of all, he was convinced that the Bible describes a human's transformation from a materialistic to a spiritual being, which he calls rebirth or regeneration. He begins this work by outlining how the creation myth was not an account of the creation of Earth, but an account of man's rebirth or regeneration in six steps represented by the six days of creation. Everything related to mankind in the Bible could also be related to Jesus Christ, and how Christ freed himself from materialistic boundaries through the glorification of his human presence by making it Divine. Swedenborg examines this idea in his exposition of Genesis and Exodus.

Marriage 
One often discussed aspect of Swedenborg's writing is his ideas on marriage. Swedenborg himself remained a bachelor all his life, but that did not hinder him from writing voluminously on the subject. His work on Marriage Love (Conjugial Love in older translations) (1768) was dedicated to this purpose.

A central question with regard to marriage is whether it stops at death or continues into heaven. The question arises due to a statement attributed to Jesus that there is no marriage in heaven (Luke 20:27–38, Matthew 22:23–32, and Mark 12:18–27). Swedenborg wrote The Lord God Jesus Christ on Marriage in Heaven as a detailed analysis of what he meant.

The quality of the relationship between husband and wife resumes in the spiritual world in whatever state it was at their death in this world. Thus, a couple in true marriage love remain together in that state in heaven into eternity. A couple lacking in that love by one or both partners, however, will separate after death and each will be given a compatible new partner if they wish. A partner is also given to a person who loved the ideal of marriage but never found a true partner in this world. The exception in both cases is a person who hates chaste marriage and thus cannot receive such a partner.

Swedenborg saw creation as a series of pairings, descending from the Divine love and wisdom that define God and are the basis of creation. This duality can be seen in the pairing of good and truth, charity and faith, God and the church, and husband and wife. In each case, the goal for these pairs is to achieve conjunction between the two component parts. In the case of marriage, the object is to bring about the joining of the two partners at the spiritual and physical levels, and the happiness that comes as a consequence.

Trinity
Swedenborg rejected the common explanation of the Trinity as a Trinity of Persons, which he said was not taught in the early Christian church. There was, for instance, no mention in the Apostolic writings of any "Son from eternity". Instead he explained in his theological writings how the Divine Trinity exists in One Person, in One God, the Lord Jesus Christ, which he said is taught in Colossians 2:9. According to The Heavenly Doctrine, Jesus, the Son of God, came into the world because of the spread of evil here.

Swedenborg spoke in virtually all his works against what he regarded as the incomprehensible Trinity of Persons concept. He said that people of other religions opposed Christianity because of its doctrine of a Trinity of Persons. He considered the separation of the Trinity into three separate Persons to have originated with the First Council of Nicaea and the Athanasian Creed.

Sola Fide (Faith Alone)
The Heavenly Doctrine rejects the concept of salvation through faith-alone (sola-fide in Latin), since he considered both faith and charity necessary for salvation, not one without the other, whereas the Reformers taught that faith-alone procured justification, although it must be a faith which resulted in obedience. The purpose of faith, according to The Heavenly Doctrine, is to lead a person to a life according to the truths of faith, which is charity, as is taught in 1 Corinthians 13:13 and James 2:20.

In other words, Swedenborg spoke sharply against the faith-alone doctrine of Luther and others. He held that justification before God was not based solely upon some imputed righteousness before God, and was not achievable merely by a gift of God's grace (sola gratia), granted without any basis in a person's actual behavior in life. Sola-fide was a doctrine averred by Martin Luther, John Calvin, Ulrich Zwingli and others during the Protestant Reformation, and was a core belief especially in the theology of the Lutheran reformers Martin Luther and Philip Melanchthon.

Although the sola-fide doctrine of the Reformers also emphasized that saving faith was one that effected works (by faith-alone, but not by a faith which is alone), Swedenborg protested against faith-alone being the instrument of justification, and held that salvation is only possible through the conjunction of faith and charity in a person, and that the purpose of faith is to lead a person to live according to the truths of faith, which is charity. He further states that faith and charity must be exercised by doing good out of willing good whenever possible, which are good works or good uses or the conjunction perishes. In one section he wrote:

Later history 
Swedenborg made no attempt to found a church. A few years after his death – 15 (~1787) by one estimate – for the most part in England, small reading groups formed to study his teachings. As one scholar states, The Heavenly Doctrine particularly appealed to the various dissenting groups that sprang up in the first half of the 18th century who were "surfeited with revivalism and narrow-mindedness" and found his optimism and comprehensive explanations appealing.

A variety of important cultural figures, both writers and artists, were influenced by Swedenborg's writings, including Robert Frost, Johnny Appleseed, William Blake, Jorge Luis Borges, Daniel Burnham, Arthur Conan Doyle,
Ralph Waldo Emerson, John Flaxman, George Inness, Henry James Sr., Carl Jung, Immanuel Kant, Honoré de Balzac, Helen Keller, Czesław Miłosz, Joseph Smith, August Strindberg, D. T. Suzuki, and W. B. Yeats. His philosophy had a great impact on the Duke of Södermanland, later King Carl XIII, who as the Grand Master of Swedish Freemasonry (Svenska Frimurare Orden) built its unique system of degrees and wrote its rituals. In contrast, one of the most prominent Swedish authors of Swedenborg's day, Johan Henric Kellgren, called Swedenborg "nothing but a fool". A heresy trial was initiated in Sweden in 1768 against Swedenborg writings and two men who promoted them.

In the two and a half centuries since Swedenborg's death, various interpretations of his theology have been made, and he has also been scrutinized in biographies and psychological studies. Swedenborg, with his claimed new dispensation, has been considered by some to have a  mental illness.
While the insanity explanation was not uncommon during Swedenborg's own time, it is mitigated by his activity in the Swedish Riddarhuset (the House of the Nobility), the Riksdag (the Swedish parliament), and the Royal Swedish Academy of Sciences. Additionally, the system of thought in his theological writings is considered by some to be remarkably coherent. Furthermore, he was characterized by his contemporaries as a "kind and warm-hearted man", "amiable in his meeting with the public", speaking "easily and naturally of his spiritual experiences", with pleasant and interesting conversation. An English friend of Kant's who visited Swedenborg at Kant's behest described Swedenborg as a "reasonable, pleasant and candid man and scholar". Of note here is Swedenborg's statement that he was commanded by the Lord to publish his writings and "Do not believe that without this express command I would have thought of publishing things which I knew in advance would make me look ridiculous and many people would think lies".

Works

Copies of the original Latin version in which Swedenborg wrote his revelation are available from the following sources.

The common names used in a New Church listing are given parenthetically, followed by the titles in the original. All the titles listed were published by Swedenborg except The Spiritual Diary. Various minor reports and tracts have been omitted from the list.

 1716–1718, (Daedalus Hyperboreus) Swedish: Daedalus Hyperboreus, eller några nya mathematiska och physicaliska försök. (English: The Northern inventor, or some new experiments in mathematics and physics)
 1721, (Principles of Chemistry) Latin: Prodromus principiorum rerum naturalium: sive novorum tentaminum chymiam et physicam experimenta geometrice explicandi
 1722, (Miscellaneous Observations) Latin: Miscellanea de Rebus Naturalibus
 1734, (Principia) Latin: Opera Philosophica et Mineralia (English: Philosophical and Mineralogical Works), three volumes
 (Principia, Volume I) Latin: Tomus I. Principia rerum naturlium sive novorum tentaminum phaenomena mundi elementaris philosophice explicandi
 (Principia, Volume II) Latin: Tomus II. Regnum subterraneum sive minerale de ferro
 (Principia, Volume III) Latin: Tomus III. Regnum subterraneum sive minerale de cupro et orichalco 
 1734, (The Infinite and Final Cause of Creation) Latin: Prodromus Philosophiz Ratiocinantis de Infinito, et Causa Finali Creationis; deque Mechanismo Operationis Animae et Corporis.
 
1742, ( The Soul Or Rational Psychology)
 1744–1745, (The Animal Kingdom) Latin: Regnum animale, 3 volumes
 1745, (The Worship and Love of God) Latin: De Cultu et Amore Dei, 2 volumes
 1749–1756, (Arcana Cœlestia or Caelestia) (Heavenly Mysteries) Latin: Arcana Cœlestia, quae in Scriptura Sacra seu Verbo Domini sunt, detecta, 8 volumes
 1758, (Heaven and Hell) Latin: De Caelo et Ejus Mirabilibus et de inferno. Ex Auditis et Visis.
 1758, (The Last Judgment) Latin: De Ultimo Judicio
 1758, (The White Horse) Latin: De Equo Albo de quo in Apocalypsi Cap. XIX.
 1758, (Earths in the Universe) Latin:  De Telluribus in Mundo Nostro Solari, quæ vocantur planetæ: et de telluribus in coelo astrifero: deque illarum incolis; tum de spiritibus & angelis ibi; ex auditis & visis.
 1758, (The New Jerusalem and Its Heavenly Doctrine) Latin: De Nova Hierosolyma et Ejus Doctrina Coelesti
 1763, (Doctrine of the Lord) Latin:Doctrina Novæ Hierosolymæ de Domino.
 1763, (Doctrine of the Sacred Scripture) Latin: Doctrina Novæ Hierosolymæ de Scriptura Sacra. 
 1763, (Doctrine of Life) Latin: Doctrina Vitæ pro Nova Hierosolyma ex præceptis Decalogi.
 1763, (Doctrine of Faith) Latin: Doctrina Novæ Hierosolymæ de Fide.
 1763, (Continuation of The Last Judgement) Latin:  Continuatio De Ultimo Judicio: et de mundo spirituali. 
 1763, (Divine Love and Wisdom) Latin:  Sapientia Angelica de Divino Amore et de Divina Sapientia. Sapientia Angelica de Divina Providentia. 
 1764, (Divine Providence) Latin: Sapientia Angelica de Divina Providentia. 
 1766, (Apocalypse Revealed) Latin: Apocalypsis Revelata, in quae detegunter Arcana quae ibi preedicta sunt.
 1768, (Conjugial Love, or Marriage Love) Latin:  Deliciae Sapientiae de Amore Conjugiali; post quas sequumtur voluptates insaniae de amore scortatorio. 
 1769, (Brief Exposition) Latin: Summaria Expositio Doctrinæ Novæ Ecclesiæ, quæ per Novam Hierosolymam in Apocalypsi intelligitur. 
 1769, (Interaction of the Soul and the Body) Latin: De Commercio Animæ & Corporis.
 1771, (True Christian Religion) Latin: Vera Christiana Religio, continens Universam Theologiam Novae Ecclesiae
 1859, Drömboken, Journalanteckningar (Journal of Dreams), 1743–1744
 
 
 
 1983–1997, (Spiritual Diary) Latin: Diarum, Ubi Memorantur Experientiae Spirituales.

In popular culture
The song The Dreams of Swedenborg, from symphonic metal band Therion's 2004 album Lemuria, talks about Swedenborg's revelations.

Swedenborg's book Heaven and its Wonders and Hell From Things Heard and Seen is a major contributor to the plot of the movie Things Heard & Seen, which premiered on Netflix in 2021.

Posthumous honours
The mineral swedenborgite, discovered in Långban, Sweden in 1924, is named in his honor.

See also
 Swedenborg Society

 List of Christian thinkers in science
 Lord's New Church Which Is Nova Hierosolyma
 The New Church (Swedenborgian)
 General Church of the New Jerusalem
 Swedenborgian Church of North America
 Swedenborg Rite
 Wayfarers Chapel
 Daniil Andreyev

Notes

References

Sources 
 Ahlstrom, S.E. A Religious History of the American People (Yale 1972) Includes section on Swedenborg by this scholar.
 Benz, Ernst, Emanuel Swedenborg: Visionary Savant in the Age of Reason (Swedenborg Foundation, 2002) , a translation of the thorough German language study on life and work of Swedenborg, Emanuel Swedenborg: Naturforscher und Seher by the noted religious scholar Ernst Benz, published in Munich in 1948.
 Bergquist, Lars, Swedenborg's Secret, (London, The Swedenborg Society, 2005) , a translation of the Swedish language biography of Swedenborg, Swedenborgs Hemlighet, published in Stockholm in 1999. 
 Block, M. B. The New Church in the New World. A study of Swedenborgianism in America (Holt 1932; Octagon reprint 1968) A detailed history of the ideational and social development of the organized churches based on Swedenborg's works.
 Crompton, S. Emanuel Swedenborg (Chelsea House, 2005) Recent biography of Swedenborg.
 Johnson, G., ed. Kant on Swedenborg. Dreams of a Spirit-Seer and Other Writings. Translation by Johnson, G., Magee, G.E. (Swedenborg Foundation 2002) New translation and extensive set of supplementary texts.
 Lamm, Martin, Swedenborg: En studie (1987; first ed. 1915). A popular biography that is still read and quoted. It is also available in English: Emanuel Swedenborg: The Development of His Thought, Martin Lamm (Swedenborg Studies, No. 9, 2001), 
 Lagercrantz, Olof, Dikten om livet på den andra sidan (Wahlström & Widstrand 1996), . In Swedish.
 Leon, James, Overcoming Objections to Swedenborg's Writings Through the Development of Scientific Dualism  An examination of Swedenborg's discoveries. The author is a professor of psychology (1998; published in New Philosophy, 2001)
 Moody, R. A. Life after Life (Bantam 1975) Reports correlation of near-death experience with Swedenborg's reports of life after death.
 Price, R. Johnny Appleseed. Man and Myth (Indiana 1954) Definitive study of this legendary man. Includes details of his interest in Swedenborg and the organizational New Church
 Robsahm, Carl, Hallengren, Anders (translation and comments), Anteckningar om Swedenborg (Föreningen Swedenborgs Minne: Stockholm 1989), . Hallengren writes that the first complete publication of the Robsam manuscript was in R. L. Tafel's Documents, Vol. I, 1875 (see section "Further reading")
 Schuchard, Marsha Keith. 2011. Emanuel Swedenborg, Secret Agent on Earth and in Heaven: Jacobites, Jews and Freemasons in Early Modern Sweden. Brill.
Sigstedt, C.,The Swedenborg Epic. The Life and Works of Emanuel Swedenborg (New York: Bookman Associates, 1952). The whole book is available online at Swedenborg Digital Library.

Further reading 
 Newer material
 The Arms of Morpheus—Essays on Swedenborg and Mysticism, ed. Stephen McNeilly (London: Swedenborg Society, 2007), .
 Between Method and Madness—Essays on Swedenborg and Literature, ed. Stephen McNeilly (London: Swedenborg Society, 2005), .
 In Search of the Absolute—Essays on Swedenborg and Literature, ed. Stephen McNeilly (London: Swedenborg Society, 2005), .
 On the True Philosopher and the True Philosophy—Essays on Swedenborg, ed. Stephen McNeilly (London: Swedenborg Society, 2005), .
 Swedenborg and His Influence, ed. Erland J. Brock, (Bryn Athyn, Pennsylvania: The Academy of the New Church, 1988), .
 Jonathan S. Rose, ed. Emanuel Swedenborg: Essays for the New Century Edition on His Life, Work, and Impact (West Chester, Pennsylvania: Swedenborg Foundation, 2002), . 580 pages. Multiple scholars contributed to this collection of information on Swedenborg, his manuscripts, and his cultural influence. Republished in 2004 under new title, Scribe of Heaven: Swedenborg's Life, Work, and Impact .
 Wilson van Dusen, The Presence of Other Worlds, Swedenborg Foundation, Inc., New York, Harper & Row, 1974. 
 "The Madness Hypothesis," a special issue of The New Philosophy (1998;101: whole number), a journal produced by the Swedenborg Scientific Association, reviews the question of Swedenborg's sanity in scholarly detail, making the case that he was in fact quite sane.
 Donald L. Rose, ed., Afterlife: A Guided Tour of Heaven and Its Wonders. Swedenborg Foundation, 2006. (abridged version of Heaven and Hell)
 D. T. Suzuki, translated by Andrew Bernstein, Afterword by David Loy, Swedenborg: Buddha of the North. Swedenborg Foundation, 1996. (Brilliantly shows relevance of Swedenborg's ideas to Buddhist thought.)
 Nemitz, K., "The Man and His Work ".
 Larsen, T, Larsen, Lawrence, JF, Woofenden WR. Emanuel Swedenborg. A Continuing Vision. Swedenborg Foundation, 1988
 Sig Synnestvedt, ed., The Essential Swedenborg: Basic Religious Teachings of Emanuel Swedenborg. Swedenborg Foundation, 1970.

 Older material of importance (some of it not in print)
 
 The most extensive work is: RL Tafel, Documents concerning the Life and Character of Swedenborg, collected, translated and annotated (3 vols., Swedenborg Society, 1875–1877);
 J. Hyde, A Bibliography of the Works of Emanuel Swedenborg (Swedenborg Society).
 Kant's Träume eines Geistersehers (1766; the most recent edition in English is from 1975);
 J. G. Herder's "Emanuel Swedenborg," in his Adrastea (Werke zur Phil. und Gesch., xii. 110–125).
 Transactions of the International Swedenborg Congress (London, 1910), summarized in The New Church Magazine (August 1910).
 Swedenborg and Esoteric Islam (Swedenborg Studies, No 4) by Henry Corbin, Leonard Fox
 Ralph Waldo Emerson, "Swedenborg; or, the Mystic", in Emerson: Essays and Lectures (New York, New York: The Library of America, 1983), .
 William White, Emmanuel Swedenborg, His Life and Writings, 2nd Ed., Rev. (xx, 767 p.; London, Simpkin, Marshall, and Co., 1868) – This is the second of White's two biographies of Swedenborg, the first one published in 1856 (White, W. Swedenborg: his life and writings Bath : I. Pitman, Phonetic Institution, 1856) and this second one in 1867. White worked for the Swedenborg Society in London and wrote an affirmative biography of Swedenborg. However, he was fired for publishing spiritist books and selling them at the Society's store, as well as otherwise interfering with the Society's function. White's response was the 1867 biography, in which he, in Tafel's words, "turn[ed] a complete somersault in his convictions," and wrote a highly derogatory biography of Swedenborg and his teachings. (The Swedenborg Epic footnote # 769) (R. Tafel, Documents Concerning the Life and Character of Emanuel Swedenborg, Vol. 3, p. 1284. London. Swedenborg Society 1890)

External links 

 
 
 

 
 
1688 births
1772 deaths
18th-century apocalypticists
18th-century Christian mystics
18th-century essayists
18th-century Latin-language writers
18th-century non-fiction writers
18th-century male writers
18th-century occultists
18th-century philosophers
18th-century Swedish writers
Afterlife in Christianity
Age of Enlightenment
Age of Liberty people
Angelic visionaries
Burials at Uppsala Cathedral
Christian philosophers
Christian theologians
Consciousness researchers and theorists
Enlightenment philosophers
Epistemologists
Founders of new religious movements
Intellectual history
Members of the Royal Swedish Academy of Sciences
Metaphilosophers
Metaphysicians
Metaphysics writers
Mystics
New Age predecessors
New Thought mystics
Ontologists
Philosophers of education
Philosophers of love
Philosophers of mind
Philosophers of religion
Philosophers of science
Philosophers of social science
Philosophical cosmologists
Social philosophers
Spiritual mediums
18th-century Swedish astronomers
Swedish Christians
Swedish ethicists
Swedish expatriates in the Dutch Republic
Swedish male non-fiction writers
Swedish nobility
Swedish philosophers
18th-century Swedish scientists
Swedish spiritual writers
 
Swedish theologians
Theorists on Western civilization
Uppsala University alumni
Writers about religion and science
Writers from Stockholm
17th-century Lutheran theologians
18th-century Lutheran theologians